Cloudy Sunday (in , Ouzeri Tsitsanis) is a 2015 Greek drama film directed by Manousos Manousakis. The film is set during the occupation of Thessaloniki, Greece's second largest city and home to the largest population of Jews in Greece, by Nazi Germany during WWII.

Cast 
 Andreas Konstantinou - Vassilis Tsitsanis
 Haris Fragoulis - Giorgos Samaras
 Christina Hilla Fameli - Estrea Beza
 Vasiliki Troufakou - Lela (Lambrini)
 Yannis Stankoglou - Jaco Beza
 Gerasimos Skiadaresis - Yannis

References

External links 

2015 drama films
2015 films
Films shot in Thessaloniki
Films set in Thessaloniki
Greek drama films
Judaeo-Spanish-language films